Crazy in Love is the fifty-fifth studio album by American country music artist Conway Twitty.  It was released in 1990 on MCA Records, and included a pair of top three hits, one in the title track, and the other in the song "I Couldn't See You Leavin'".

"Shadow of a Distant Friend" is a cover of a Waylon Jennings song titled, "The Shadow of Your Distant Friend" from his 1986 album, Will the Wolf Survive. 
"Just the Thought of Losing You" was originally recorded by Kenny Rogers on his 1986 album, They Don't Make Them Like They Used To.

Track listing

Production
Produced By Conway Twitty, Dee Henry & Jimmy Bowen
Engineers: Dave Boyer, Tim Kish, Russ Martin, Ron Treat
Overdubs Recorded By Ron Treat
Mixing: Tom Perry
Digital Editing: Milan Bogdan
Mastering: Glenn Meadows

Personnel
Drums: Eddie Bayers
Bass Guitar: Michael Rhodes
Keyboards: John Barlow Jarvis, Larry Knechtel
Synthesizer: Mike Lawler
Acoustic Guitar: Pat Flynn, Billy Joe Walker Jr.
Electric Guitar: Brent Rowan, Billy Joe Walker Jr.
Mandolin: Pat Flynn
Lead Vocals: Conway Twitty
Backing Vocals: Harry Stinson, Curtis Young

Chart performance

References 

1990 albums
Conway Twitty albums
MCA Records albums
Albums produced by Jimmy Bowen